Gelitin (stylized in lowercase) is a group of four artists from Vienna, Austria. The group was formerly known as Gelatin and changed their name in 2005. They are known for creating sensational art events in the tradition of Relational Aesthetics, often with a lively sense of humor.

Among their projects are a gigantic plush toy: a 55 meter tall pink Bunny on Colletto Fava (near Genoa, Italy), intended to remain there until 2025. In November 2005, the group had a show at Leo Koenig, Inc. in New York, a project called Tantamounter 24/7. The project was a "gigantic, complex and very clever machine", according to the artists, which functioned as a kind of art-Xerox. The group erected a barrier blocking off one half of the space, locking themselves inside for one week, then asking visitors to insert items that they wanted copied into an opening in the barrier, which copies were then returned through another opening.

Works

The B-Thing
One of Gelitin's best known art projects began in March 2000, when the group allegedly removed one of the windows on the 91st floor of the former World Trade Center complex and temporarily installed a narrow balcony, while a helicopter flew around the scene, taking photographs to be later documented in their book The B-Thing. The book was published in 2001 and had even by that time taken on an air of urban legend, with new copies selling for $5,000 on Amazon.com as of 2016.

Other works include:
 vorm - fellows - attitude, 2018, at the Museum Boijmans Van Beuningen, Rotterdam, The Netherlands: giant sculptures of feces, with visitors encouraged to put on costumes representing nude men and women
 La Louvre, Paris, 2008, at ARC, Musée d'Art Moderne de la Ville de Paris
 Tantamounter 24/7, 2005, a "gigantic, complex and very clever machine" created at Leo Koenig, New York
 Hase (Rabbit / Coniglio), 2005, a 55-meter knitted pink rabbit on Colletto Fava
 Zapf de Pipi, 2005, a sculpture of frozen urine as contributed by the visitors at the Moscow Biennale of Contemporary Art
 Otto Volante, 2004, a roller coaster inside a gallery in Milan, Italy
 Arc de Triomphe, 2003, a 7-meter tall fountain picturing a urinating figure made of 2000 kg of Plasticine in Salzburg, Austria
 Armpit, 2002, a human elevator of Body Builders for the Liverpool Biennial
 Schlund, 2001, a human scaffolding of fat people at the Bavarian Theatre, Munich, Germany
 Die totale Osmose, 2001, a swamp surrounding the Austrian Pavilion at the Venice Biennale
 The B-Thing, 2000, a small temporary balcony on the 91st floor of the World Trade Center
 Weltwunder, 2000, a hidden underwater cave, only accessible by diving through a pipe 5 meters deep, as part of the Expo 2000 in Hannover, Germany

References

External links
 

Austrian artist groups and collectives
Austrian contemporary artists